Weyburn is the tenth-largest city in Saskatchewan, Canada. The city has a population of 10,870. The name is reputedly a corruption of the Scottish "wee burn," referring to a small creek. The city is surrounded by the Rural Municipality of Weyburn No. 67.

History 
The Canadian Pacific Railway (CPR) reached the future site of Weyburn from Brandon, Manitoba in 1892 and the Soo Line from North Portal on the US border in 1893. A post office opened in 1895 and a land office in 1899 in anticipation of the land rush which soon ensued. In 1899, Knox Presbyterian Church was founded with its building constructed in 1906 in the high-pitched gable roof and arches, standing as a testimony to the faith and optimism in the Weyburn area. Weyburn was legally constituted a village in 1900, a town in 1903 and finally as a city in 1913. From 1910 until 1931 the Weyburn Security Bank was headquartered in the city.

Weyburn had since become an important railroad town in Saskatchewan – the Pasqua branch of the Souris, Arcola, Weyburn, Regina CPR branch; Portal Section of the CPR / Soo Line; Moose Jaw, Weyburn, Shaunavon, Lethbridge CPR section; the Brandon, Marfield, Carlyle, Lampman, Radville, Willow Bunch section of the Canadian National Railway (CNR); and the Regina, Weyburn, Radville, Estevan, Northgate CNR section have all run through Weyburn.

Weyburn was previously home to the Souris Valley Mental Health Hospital, which was closed as a health care facility and sold in 2006, and demolished in 2009. When the mental hospital opened in 1921, it was the largest building in the British Commonwealth and was considered to be on the cutting edge of experimental treatments for people with mental disabilities. The facility had a reputation of leading the way in therapeutic programming. At its peak, the facility was home to approximately 2,500 patients. The history of the facility is explored in the documentary Weyburn: An Archaeology of Madness.

Demographics 

Geography and climate 
The Souris River continues southeast through North Dakota eventually meeting the Assiniboine River in Manitoba. In the 1800s this area was known as an extension of the Greater Yellow Grass Marsh. Extensive flood control programs have created reservoirs, parks and waterfowl centres along the Souris River. Between 1988 and 1995, the Rafferty-Alameda Project was constructed to alleviate spring flooding problems created by the Souris River.

Climate 
Weyburn has a humid continental climate (Köppen Dfb) typical of Southern Saskatchewan.

Economy 
Weyburn is the largest inland grain gathering point in Canada. Well over half a million tons of grain pass through the Weyburn terminals each year. Oil and gas exploration make up the other major component of the economy.

Culture 
The Soo Line Historical Museum (c. 1910) is a Municipal Heritage Property under Saskatchewan's Heritage Property Act.

Weyburn is also home to the world's first curling museum, the Turner Curling Museum.

Education

Elementary and secondary 
The public school system, South East Cornerstone School Division No. 209, operates the following schools.
 Assiniboia Park Elementary School
 Legacy Park Elementary School
 Weyburn Comprehensive High School
 Haig School (now closed)
 Queen Elizabeth School (now closed)
 Souris School (now closed)
It also operated Weyburn Junior High School from 1966 to 2016, which was closed in favour of relocating students to Weyburn Comprehensive High School.

Haig School, Queen Elizabeth School, and Souris School are being closed in favour of relocating students to Legacy Park Elementary School in September 2021.

The separate school system, Holy Family Roman Catholic Separate School Division No. 140, operates St. Michael School.

Post-secondary 
Southeast College offers technical, trade and non-degree programs, as well as distance learning from the University of Regina and University of Saskatchewan.

Other 
The Weyburn Public Library is a branch of the Southeast Regional Library system.

Infrastructure

Transportation 
Weyburn is at the junction of highways 13, 35 and 39. The Weyburn Airport is northeast of the city.

Utilities 
Electricity is provided by SaskPower and natural gas is provided by SaskEnergy. The city maintains its own water treatment plant and waste management system. Telephone and internet services are provided by both SaskTel and Access Communications.

Health care 
The Weyburn General Hospital is operated by the SunCountry Health Region.

Public safety 
The Weyburn Police Service and local RCMP detachment provide law enforcement for the city. Fire protection services are provided by the Weyburn Fire Department.

Sports and recreation 
Weyburn is the home of the Weyburn Red Wings of the Saskatchewan Junior Hockey League (SJHL) and the Weyburn Beavers of the Western Canadian Baseball League, a collegiate summer baseball league in Canada's prairie provinces. In addition, Weyburn is home to Saskatchewan's largest amateur wrestling club.

Local media 
 Golden West Broadcasting operates three radio stations that serve Weyburn and the surrounding area; full service country station CFSL 1190 AM, hot adult contemporary station CKRC-FM 103.5, and mainstream rock station CHWY-FM 106.7. All three stations, and the cluster's news website Discover Weyburn, are based out of studios on 305 Souris Avenue in downtown Weyburn.
 Glacier Media Group publishes three newspapers for Weyburn and area: the Weyburn Review, Weyburn and Area Booster, and Weyburn This Week.

Notable people 
Tenille Arts - country music singer
Pat Binns - former premier of Prince Edward Island
Neil Cameron - politician, academic, journalist
Graham DeLaet - professional golfer
Shirley Douglas - actress
Tommy Douglas - politician, recipient of The Greatest Canadian award in 2004
Larry Giroux, played in the NHL for the Detroit Red Wings, Hartford Whalers, Kansas City Scouts, and St. Louis Blues
Eric Grimson - former Chancellor of the Massachusetts Institute of Technology
Brett Jones - professional football player
Guy Gavriel Kay - writer
Trenna Keating – actress
Brendon LaBatte - professional football player
W. O. Mitchell - writer
Humphry Osmond - medical researcher
Derrick Pouliot - professional hockey player
John Saywell - Canadian historian
Dave "Tiger" Williams - former professional hockey player

References

External links 

 
1898 establishments in Saskatchewan
Cities in Saskatchewan
Division No. 2, Saskatchewan
Populated places established in 1898